Member Herman Badillo, who had served for 8 years, was appointed deputy mayor of New York City.  He resigned December 31, 1977 from the U.S. House to become Mayor.

On February 14, 1978, Democratic state senator Robert Garcia easily beat fellow Democrat Louis Nine in a special election.  Garcia had to run on the Republican election line, but was accepted back as a Democrat, once elected.  He would continue to represent the district for 12 years.

See also 
 List of special elections to the United States House of Representatives

Notes

References 

New York 1978 21
New York 1978 21
1978 21
New York 21
United States House of Representatives 21
United States House of Representatives 1978 21